Johan Rathje (26 September 1915 – 21 August 1996) was a Danish sailor. He competed in the Swallow event at the 1948 Summer Olympics.

References

External links
 

1915 births
1996 deaths
Danish male sailors (sport)
Olympic sailors of Denmark
Sailors at the 1948 Summer Olympics – Swallow
People from Svendborg
Sportspeople from the Region of Southern Denmark